Guilherme Figueiredo (1915–1997) was a Brazilian dramatist. He is best known for his play The Fox and the Grapes (A raposa e as uvas) in 1953 about Aesop's life.

20th-century Brazilian dramatists and playwrights
Brazilian male dramatists and playwrights
1915 births
1997 deaths
20th-century Brazilian male writers